In mathematics, a sofic group is a group whose Cayley graph is an initially subamenable graph, or equivalently a subgroup of an ultraproduct of finite-rank symmetric groups such that every two  elements of the group have distance 1.

The class of sofic groups is closed under the operations of taking subgroups, extensions by amenable groups, and free products. A finitely generated group is sofic if it is the limit of a sequence of sofic groups. The limit of a sequence of amenable groups (that is, an initially subamenable group) is necessarily sofic, but there exist sofic groups that are not initially subamenable groups.

As Gromov proved, Sofic groups are surjunctive. That is, they obey a form of the Garden of Eden theorem for cellular automata defined over the group (dynamical systems whose states are mappings from the group to a finite set and whose state transitions are translation-invariant and continuous) stating that every injective automaton is surjective and therefore also reversible.

Notes

References
.
.
.
.

Properties of groups